Trought is a surname. Notable people with the surname include:

Mike Trought (born 1980), English footballer
Stuart Trought, former President of the States of Alderney